Alphonse Welin Qorig (born 7 July 1981) is a retired Vanuatuan international footballer who played almost all of his career as a midfielder at Port Vila FA First Division side Shepherds United.

International career
Qorig represented Vanuatu over a span of 6 years between 2002 and 2008, scoring 4 goals.

International statistics

International goals
Scores and results list Burundi's goal tally first.

References

External links
 
 

1981 births
Living people
Vanuatuan footballers
2002 OFC Nations Cup players
2004 OFC Nations Cup players
2008 OFC Nations Cup players
Vanuatu international footballers
Association football midfielders